Henry Spencer is a Canadian computer programmer and space enthusiast.

Henry Spencer may also refer to:

People
Henry Spencer, 1st Earl of Sunderland (1620–1643), English nobleman and soldier
Lord Henry Spencer (1770–1795), British diplomat and politician
Henry Elvins Spencer (1882–1972), Canadian politician
Henry Spencer (fl.1402), MP for Totnes
Henry Spencer (MP for Wallingford), 15th century, see Wallingford
Henry C. Spencer (1915–1999), American businessman
Henry E. Spencer (1807–1882), mayor of Cincinnati

Characters
Henry Spencer (Psych), a character in the American television dramedy Psych
Henry Spencer, the main character from the film Eraserhead

See also
Harry Spencer (disambiguation)